Qeshlaq-e Darchin (also Romanized as Qeshlāq-e Dārchīn; also known as Dārjīn) is a village in Abish Ahmad Rural District, Abish Ahmad District, Kaleybar County, East Azerbaijan Province, Iran. At the 2006 census, its population was 86, in 16 families.

References 

Populated places in Kaleybar County